The ICML Rhino is a compact SUV produced by the Indian manufacturer ICML Motors. It is powered by a 2.0 L diesel engine.

References

Cars of India
All-wheel-drive vehicles
Cars introduced in 2006
Compact sport utility vehicles